Parting Gifts was a biannual literary magazine founded in 1987 and published by March Street Press of Greensboro, North Carolina. The journal occasionally published poetry, and focused on literary short-shorts and other flash fiction. Parting Gifts was among the select group of journals whose stories are eligible for New Stories from the South, an annual anthology. Robert J. Bixby was the editor and publisher of the journal. The magazine ceased publication in 2009.

See also
List of literary magazines
flash fiction

References

External links
 March Street Press & Parting Gifts

Biannual magazines published in the United States
Poetry magazines published in the United States
Defunct literary magazines published in the United States
Magazines established in 1988
Magazines disestablished in 2009
Magazines published in North Carolina
Mass media in Greensboro, North Carolina